Buskerud is a former county and a current electoral district in Norway, bordering Akershus, Oslo, Oppland, Sogn og Fjordane, Hordaland, Telemark and Vestfold. The region extends from the Oslofjord and Drammensfjorden in the southeast to Hardangervidda mountain range in the northwest. The county administration was in modern times located in Drammen. Buskerud was merged with Akershus and Østfold into the newly created Viken County on 1 January 2020. On the 23 February 2022 Viken County Council voted in a 49 against 38 decision to submit an application to the Norwegian government for a county demerger.

Etymology
The county was named after the old manor Buskerud (Biskopsrøysa) located on the west side of the Drammen River in Åmot, Modum municipality. The farm was one of the largest in Buskerud, and the original name of the farm (before it became a benefice) was probably Modum. At the time of the Reformation the farm became property of the Crown at which time the farm then served as the residence of the king's bailiffs until 1668.

Geography
Buskerud extended from Hurum at the Oslofjord to the Halling mountains and Hardanger. The county was conventionally divided into traditional districts. These were Hallingdal, Numedal, Ringerike, Lower Buskerud, which was originally part of Vestfold, and Western Vingulmark.

Hallingdal consisted of Flå, Nes, Gol, Hemsedal, Ål and Hol. Numedal consisted of Flesberg, Rollag and Nore og Uvdal. Ringerike consisted of Hole, Krødsherad, Modum, Ringerike and  Sigdal. Western Vingulmark consisted of Hurum and Røyken. Lower Buskerud consisted of Drammen, Hurum, Kongsberg, Lier, Nedre Eiker, Røyken and Øvre Eiker. The district was merged from parts that belonged to Vestfold and Vingulmark.

Buskerud's western part was a mountainous plateau with forested valleys and high, grassy pastures; its eastern part contains a lowland basin with many lakes and streams. Tyrifjorden and Krøderen were the biggest lakes. Numedalslågen, the third longest river in Norway, starting in Hordaland, ran through Buskerud unto Vestfold where it reached the sea, while river Begna sweeps into lake Sperillen.

Mountains
Haukefjellet
Hestebottnuten
Julsennuten
Kyrkjebønosi
Nystølsvarden
Øljunuten
Raggsteinnuten
Tyrvlesnuten
Vargebreen

History

Buskerud was separated from Akershus as an amt of its own in 1685, but the amt was smaller than today. It then consisted of the present districts Eiker, Hallingdal, and Ringerike. The area of the present municipalities of Flesberg, Hurum, Kongsberg, Lier, Nore og Uvdal, Rollag and Røyken were transferred from Akershus amt to Buskerud amt in 1760. The municipality of Skoger was transferred from Vestfold to Buskerud in 1964.

The area Ringerike may once have been a small kingdom. During the 10th century, Norway's kings Olaf Tryggvason and Olaf Haraldsson grew up at Bønsnes in Ringerike. In the valley of Numedal, silver  was mined in Kongsberg from the 17th century until discontinued in 1957. Weapons industry had been developed in Kongsberg from 1814, and various high tech industry companies now represent the town's major employers. At Modum there was also , a cobalt pigment production works (Blue Colour Works).

Economy

Today, agriculture, lumber, wood-pulp mills and other related industries are the county's main economic activities; ample hydroelectric power is produced by the rivers Begna and Rands . Buskerud has also a large forested area. Substantial income is derived from high tech industries located in Kongsberg. Other significant income comes from the cabin areas in northern Buskerud.

Coat of arms 
Buskerud's coat of arms were adopted in April 1966. It features a blue bear whose colours are symbolic of the blue colour works. The silver background of Buskerud's coat of arms represents the silver industry in Kongsberg.

Notable people from Buskerud

Sports figures
 Frode Andresen,  Ringerike
 Christer Basma,  Røyken
 Dag Bjørndalen,  Modum
 Ole Einar Bjørndalen,  Modum
 Håvard Bøkko,  Hol
 Kim Christiansen,  Drammen
 Ole Gunnar Fidjestøl,  Modum
 Tord Asle Gjerdalen,  Hole
 Erik Hagen,  Ringerike
 Anders Jacobsen,  Ringerike
 Jørre Kjemperud,  Modum
 Pål Gunnar Mikkelsplass,  Nes
 Børre Næss,  Kongsberg
 Sigurd Pettersen,  Rollag
 Steinar Pettersen,  Drammen
 Asbjørn Ruud,  Kongsberg
 Birger Ruud,  Kongsberg
 Sigmund Ruud,  Kongsberg
 Strømsgodset, Gulskogen, Drammen
 Ådne Søndrål,  Hol

Entertainers
 Sæbjørn Buttedahl, Lier
 Karin Fossum, Lier
 Morten Harket,  Kongsberg
 Thorbjørn Jagland,  Lier
 Theodor Kittelsen, Sigdal
 Jonas Lie,  Modum
 Jørgen Moe,  Hole
 Anne Marie Ottersen,  Kongsberg
 Olav Thon,  Ål
 Christian Skredsvig, Sigdal
 Jonas Fjeld, Drammen
 Elin Sogn,  Kongsberg

Municipalities

Districts

 Eiker
 Eggedal
 Hallingdal
 Hurumlandet
 Jondalen
 Numedal
 Ringerike
 Lower Buskerud
 Kjenner
 Klokkarstua

Cities

 Drammen
 Hønefoss
 Kongsberg
 Hokksund

Parishes

 Bakke
 Bragernes
 Dagali
 Drammen
 Efteløt
 Eggedal
 Eiker
 Fiskum
 Flesberg
 Flå
 Frogner
 Gol
 Haug, see Eiker
 Haug i Norderhov
 Hedenstad
 Heggen
 Hemsedal
 Hol
 Hole
 Holmen
 Holmsbu
 Hurum
 Hval
 Hønefoss
 Jondalen
 Komnes
 Kongsberg
 Krødsherad (Krydsherred)
 Lier
 Lunder
 Lyngdal
 Modum
 Nedre Eiker
 Nes (i Hallingdal)
 Nes (i Ådal)
 Norderhov
 Nore
 Nykirke
 Opdal
 Rollag
 Røyken
 Sandsvær
 Sigdal (Holem)
 Snarum
 Sollihøgda
 Strømsø
 Svene
 Sylling
 Tangen
 Torpo
 Tranby
 Tuft
 Tyristrand
 Uvdal
 Veggli
 Viker
 Ytre Ådal
 Ådal
 Ål
 Drammen Branch (LDS, 1854-1952)
 Drammen (Den Katolske Apostoliske Menighet, 1877-1935)
 Drammen and Oslo (Den Katolske Apostoliske Menighet, 1872-1932)
 Hurum Branch (LDS, 1855-1867)
 Kongsberg Branch (LDS, 1939-1948* )

Villages

 Ask
 Askgrenda
 Burud
 Bødalen
 Båtstø
 Dagali
 Dagslett
 Darbu
 Dramdal
 Drolsum
 Efteløt
 Egge
 Filtvet
 Gardnos
 Geilo
 Geithus
 Gomnes
 Gulsvik
 Hagafoss
 Hallingby
 Haugastøl
 Haugsbygd
 Helgelandsmoen
 Hen
 Hennummarka
 Holmsbu
 Hovet
 Hønefoss
 Hval
 Hvittingfoss
 Hyggen
 Kjenner
 Klokkarstua
 Konnerud
 Krokstadelva
 Kroksund
 Krøderen
 Kvisla
 Lahell
 Lampeland
 Lierbyen
 Lierskogen
 Lierstranda
 Mjøndalen
 Midtbygda
 Nakkerud
 Nedre Eggedal
 Nes, Ådal
 Nesbyen
 Nore
 Noresund
 Nærsnes
 Oddevall
 Ormåsen
 Ovenstadlia
 Prestfoss
 Reistad
 Rollag
 Rødberg
 Sjåstad
 Skoger
 Skollenborg
 Skotselv
 Slemmestad
 Sokna
 Solbergelva
 Sollihøgda
 Spikkestad
 Steinberg
 Steinsåsen
 Storsand
 Sundvollen
 Svene
 Sylling
 Sysle
 Sætre
 Tofte
 Torpo
 Tronstad
 Tyristrand
 Ustaoset
 Uvdal
 Veggli
 Vestbygda
 Vestfossen
 Vik
 Vikersund
 Åmot
 Åros
 Åsa
 Åsbygda

Former Municipalities

 Eiker
 Gol og Hemsedal
 Hønefoss
 Norderhov
 Nore
 Sandsvær
 Skoger
 Strømm
 Strømsgodset
 Tyristrand
 Uvdal
 Ytre Sandsvær
 Øvre Sandsvær
 Ådal

Gallery

References

External links

 Buskerud fylkeskommune,
  Hallingdal
  Ringerikes region
  Drammens region
 Vest region

 
Former counties of Norway
2020 disestablishments in Norway
Populated places disestablished in 2020
States and territories disestablished in 2020